Granville Waldegrave may refer to:

Granville Waldegrave, 2nd Baron Radstock (1786–1857)
Granville Waldegrave, 3rd Baron Radstock (1833–1913)
Granville Waldegrave, 4th Baron Radstock (1859–1937)